is a Japanese former actor and model who is affiliated with Pocket. He graduated from Yokohama National University's University of Electro-Communications.

Filmography

Television series

Retirement

On September 15, 2008, Ichikawa announced on his own blog that he had married a high school classmate and had retired from acting. He subsequently became a high school teacher.

References

External links
 Official profile at Pocket 

Japanese male actors
Japanese male models
1980 births
Living people
People from Yokohama
People from Kanagawa Prefecture